Just Kids is a memoir by Patti Smith, published on January 19, 2010, documenting her relationship with artist Robert Mapplethorpe.

"I didn't write it to be cathartic," she noted. "I wrote it because Robert asked me to… Our relationship was such that I knew what he would want and the quality of what he deserved. So that was my agenda for writing that book. I wrote it to fulfil my vow to him, which was on his deathbed. In finishing, I did feel that I'd fulfilled my promise."

Critical reception

Just Kids won the 2010 National Book Award for Nonfiction.
It was a Publishers Weekly’s Top 10 Best Books (2010), ALA Notable Book (2011), Los Angeles Times Book Prize finalist (Current Interest, 2010), New York Times bestseller (Nonfiction, 2010), and National Book Critics Circle Award finalist (Autobiography/Memoir, 2010).

Just Kids was featured on the January 19, 2010, episode of Fresh Air, with Smith being interviewed by Terry Gross.  Just Kids was also featured on KQED's Forum with Michael Krasny on January 28, 2010 and KCRW's Bookworm with host Michael Silverblatt in March 2010. It was the Book of the Week on BBC Radio 4 from 1–5 March 2010, with Smith reading five 15-minute excerpts from her book.

Television series
In August 2015, it was announced that Showtime was developing a limited series based on the memoir. The network landed the rights partly because Smith wanted to collaborate with writer John Logan, being a fan of his series Penny Dreadful.

References

External links
Review in The Guardian by Edmund White
Review on Frontier Psychiatrist by Gina Myers
Review on Thought Catalog by The Thoughtful Reader

Books by Patti Smith
American memoirs
National Book Award for Nonfiction winning works
2010 non-fiction books
Ecco Press books